John Reginald Sperry  (2 May 1924 – 11 February 2012) was Bishop of The Arctic from 1974 to 1990.

Born on 2 May 1924, educated at King's College, Halifax and ordained in 1951, he began his career at St Andrew's Mission in the Northwest Territories. Later he was a canon at All Saints’ Cathedral, Aklavik and then Archdeacon of Coppermine now Kugluktuk. From 1969 to 1973 he was Rector of Fort Smith when he was elevated to the episcopate. He served as a Canadian Rangers officer.

References

1924 births
2012 deaths
University of King's College alumni
Anglican archdeacons in North America
Anglican bishops of The Arctic
20th-century Anglican Church of Canada bishops
People from Kugluktuk
Members of the Order of Canada
People from Fort Smith, Northwest Territories